Sri Venkateswara Institute of Medical Sciences (SVIMS) is a Medical Institute under State Legislature Act and a speciality hospital in Tirupati, Andhra Pradesh, India. SVIMS was conceived on the lines of All India Institute of Medical Sciences Delhi, and was created by an act of the Andhra Pradesh State Legislature.  The foundation stone was laid on 18 April 1986  by N. T. Rama Rao, the then Chief Minister of Andhra Pradesh. The hospital started functioning from 2 February 1993 and later became a Medical Institute under State Legislature Act in 1995. The current director is Dr B Vengamma

Rankings 
The National Institutional Ranking Framework (NIRF) ranked Sri Venkateswara Institute of Medical Sciences 72 overall in India in 2019, 77 among universities and 29th in the medical ranking.

Academics 
The college offers the -year M.B.B.S. course with a one-year compulsory rotating internship. There are 175 seats which are filled through NEET UG exam.

Postgraduate and doctoral courses 
Sri Venkateswara Institute of Medical Sciences offers postgraduate courses in almost all super specialty subjects including surgery, medicine,  etc. Similarly it offers a variety of doctoral courses including MCh i Neurosurgery, Cardiac Surgery among others and DM in Cardiology, Neurology etc. There are more than 28 post graduate and post doctoral courses.

References

External links
 

Institute under State Legislature Act
Medical and health sciences universities in India
Medical colleges in Andhra Pradesh
Educational institutions established in 1993
1993 establishments in Andhra Pradesh
Universities and colleges in Tirupati